Caruthers Park, officially Elizabeth Caruthers Park, is a park located in South Waterfront, Portland, Oregon. Acquired in 2009, the park is named after Oregon pioneer Elizabeth Caruthers. The park includes a bocce court, public art, "splash pad", and unpaved paths.

See also
 List of parks in Portland, Oregon

References

External links

2009 establishments in Oregon
Parks in Portland, Oregon
Protected areas established in 2009
Urban public parks
South Portland, Portland, Oregon